Zenon Yanovich Bortkevich (29 May 1937 – 19 August 2010) was an Azerbaijani water polo player who competed for the Soviet Union in the 1964 Summer Olympics.

In 1964 he was a member of the Soviet team which won the bronze medal in the Olympic water polo tournament. He played all six matches and scored two goals.

See also
 List of Olympic medalists in water polo (men)

References
Zenon Bortkevich's obituary

External links
 

1937 births
2010 deaths
Azerbaijani male water polo players
Soviet male water polo players
Olympic water polo players of the Soviet Union
Water polo players at the 1964 Summer Olympics
Olympic bronze medalists for the Soviet Union
Olympic medalists in water polo
Medalists at the 1964 Summer Olympics